Alice in Wonderland, or simply Alice, is a Disney media franchise, commencing in 1951 with the theatrical release of the animated film Alice in Wonderland. The film is an adaptation of the books by Lewis Carroll, the 1865 novel Alice's Adventures in Wonderland and its 1871 sequel Through the Looking-Glass, which featured his character Alice. A live-action film directed by Tim Burton was released in 2010.

Films

Alice in Wonderland (animated)

Alice in Wonderland is a 1951 British-American animated fantasy comedy-adventure film produced by Walt Disney Productions and based primarily on Lewis Carroll's Alice's Adventures in Wonderland with several additional elements from his sequel, Through the Looking-Glass. The 13th Disney animated feature film, it was released in New York City and London on July 26, 1951, and features the voices of Kathryn Beaumont (who later voiced Wendy Darling in the 1953 film Peter Pan) as Alice, and Ed Wynn as the Mad Hatter. The theme song, "Alice in Wonderland", has since become a jazz standard.

Alice in Wonderland (live-action)

Alice in Wonderland is a 2010 American fantasy film directed by Tim Burton and written by Linda Woolverton. Released by Walt Disney Pictures, the film stars Mia Wasikowska as Alice Kingsleigh, Johnny Depp, Anne Hathaway and Helena Bonham Carter. The film was shot in the United Kingdom and the United States.

Alice Through the Looking Glass

Alice Through the Looking Glass is a 2016 American fantasy film directed by James Bobin and written by Linda Woolverton. It is a sequel to the 2010 film Alice in Wonderland. The film stars Mia Wasikowska, Johnny Depp, Helena Bonham Carter, Anne Hathaway, Sacha Baron Cohen and Rhys Ifans, and was released on May 27, 2016.

TV series

Adventures in Wonderland

Adventures in Wonderland is a live-action musical television series based on Walt Disney's animated film Alice in Wonderland. In the series, Alice (Elisabeth Harnois), was portrayed as a girl who can come and go from Wonderland simply by walking through her mirror (a reference to Wonderland's source material, Lewis Carroll's Through the Looking-Glass).

Mickey Mouse Clubhouse
An episode of Mickey Mouse Clubhouse, entitled "Mickey's Adventures in Wonderland", is based on the film.

Once Upon a Time in Wonderland

Once Upon a Time in Wonderland is an American fantasy-drama series that aired on ABC from October 10, 2013, to April 3, 2014. It was created by Edward Kitsis, Adam Horowitz, Zack Estrin, and Jane Espenson for ABC Studios. The series is a spin-off of Once Upon a Time.

Alice's Wonderland Bakery

Alice's Wonderland Bakery is an American computer-animated television series which is produced by Disney Television Animation and premiered on Disney Junior on February 9, 2022.

Video games

Alice in Wonderland (2000)

Alice in Wonderland is a platform video game developed by Digital Eclipse Software and published by Nintendo for the Game Boy Color. It was released in North America on October 4, 2000. The game follows the plot of the 1951 animated film of the same name.

Kingdom Hearts series
Wonderland is a playable world in the Kingdom Hearts video game series, appearing for first time in the first Kingdom Hearts, and returns in Kingdom Hearts: Chain of Memories, Kingdom Hearts 358/2 Days, Kingdom Hearts coded as a digitized version of the world originating from data in Jiminy Cricket's royal journal, and Kingdom Hearts χ. Alice is also a major character in the overall plot of the first game due to her role as one of seven "Princesses of Heart". All except the Doorknob also appear in and Chain of Memories, albeit in the form of illusions made from the main character's memory. The Mad Hatter and the March Hare appear in portrait form as well, appearing in corporeal form in Kingdom Hearts χ, in addition to Tweedle Dee and Tweedle Dum. Caterpillar appears in the non-official game Kingdom Hearts V Cast, and also in the manga adpatation of Kingdom Hearts.

Alice in Wonderland (2010)

Alice in Wonderland is an action adventure video game published in 2010 by Disney Interactive Studios. The game can be used on Wii, Nintendo DS, Windows PC and Zeebo, with the soundtrack being composed by video game music composer Richard Jacques.

Disney Infinity series
The 1951 film was referenced throughout the Disney Infinity series with power discs and in-game toys released for the game. On May 24, 2016, Alice, the Mad Hatter, and Time from Alice Through the Looking Glass were added to Disney Infinity 3.0. The three Alice characters were the penultimate additions to the series as Disney cancelled the Disney Infinity franchise earlier that month, with the Finding Dory playset and Dory and Nemo figures that were released the following month of June being the final releases.

Disney Magic Kingdoms
The world builder game Disney Magic Kingdoms includes the attraction Mad Tea Party since its launch on 17 March, 2016. Alice's Curious Labyrinth also appears as part of the environment next to the Fantasyland area. During a limited time 2017 Event focused on Alice in Wonderland, were included Alice, White Rabbit, Mad Hatter, March Hare, Cheshire Cat, Queen of Hearts and Caterpillar as playable characters, along with the attractions Alice in Wonderland, The Golden Afternoon, The Tweedle's Wacky Fairway, and White Rabbit's House, with the characters involved in new storylines.

Theme park attractions and rides

Alice in Wonderland Maze
A labyrinth opened on Shanghaî Disneyland on June 16, 2016, with the Park. It is based on Tim Burton's 2010 film.

Alice's Curious Labyrinth

Alice's Curious Labyrinth is a hedge maze attraction at the Disneyland Park within Disneyland Paris. It opened in 1992 with the Park, and belongs to the British part of Fantasyland.

Mad Tea Party

Mad Tea Party is a spinning tea cup ride at all five Disneyland-style theme parks. The ride theme is inspired by the Unbirthday Party scene in Alice In Wonderland. The ride has gained attention over the years for the number of people who get motion sickness as a result of the spinning component of the ride.

Alice in Wonderland (ride)

Alice in Wonderland is a dark ride in Fantasyland at Disneyland in Anaheim, California. Based on the animated adaptation of the same name, the attraction resides next to a second ride, the Mad Tea Party, based on a scene in that same adaptation. The presence of two rides based on the film is unusual in that Walt Disney said he regretted making it because it lacked a connection to the audience's hearts.

Mad T Party

Mad T Party is a show at Disney California Adventure which occurs in the Hollywood Studios subsection of the Hollywood Land section of the park. Mad T Party premiered on June 15, 2012, the same day the park was re-dedicated. The show is inspired by Tim Burton's Alice in Wonderland.

Stage version

Alice in Wonderland Jr.
Alice in Wonderland Jr. is a one-act stage version intended for middle and high school productions. It includes the majority of the film's songs and others including Song of the Souths "Zip-a-Dee-Doo-Dah", two new reprises of "I'm Late!", and three new numbers entitled "Ocean of Tears", "Simon Says" and "Who Are You?" respectively. This 60-/80-minute version is owned by Music Theatre International in the Broadway, Jr. Collection.

Music

Alice in Wonderland soundtrack
Alice in Wonderland was first released on LP record on July 28, 1951, and re-released on Audio CD in 1998.

Almost Alice

Almost Alice is a concept album of various artists' music inspired by Burton's Alice in Wonderland. The album is also notable for featuring songs that were inspired from quotes directly from Lewis Carroll's original novel. The album was released by Buena Vista Records on March 2, 2010. It debuted at number five on the Billboard 200.

References

 
Walt Disney Studios (division) franchises
Works based on Alice in Wonderland
Wonderland